Vijaya Prasad is an Indian actor, director, producer, and writer.

Career
He started his career in Kannada TV serial Silli Lalli as comedy actor and writer. Later he entered into directional profession. Sidlingu his first directional film.

Filmography

Awards
 Filmfare Award for Best Director – Kannada - (2012) for Sidlingu

References

External links
 

Male actors in Kannada cinema
Indian male film actors
Kannada film directors
Kannada screenwriters
Living people
Filmfare Awards South winners
Male actors from Bangalore
21st-century Indian male actors
Year of birth missing (living people)